John Plath (born 17 March 1969) is an Australian former rugby league footballer who played in the 1990s. He played in all of the Brisbane Broncos' first four grand final wins from the interchange bench and retired as the most-capped Bronco not to have played representative football.

Plath was a Queensland Schoolboy rugby union representative in 1986/87. He played rugby league for Wynnum-Manly Seagulls before he was graded by the Brisbane Broncos from their Colts team in 1990. Plath also had a season with the London Crusaders in 1991-92.

His utility value saw him on the bench in the Broncos' inaugural grand final win in 1992. In the weeks following the grand final Plath travelled with the Broncos to England, where he played from the interchange bench in the 1992 World Club Challenge against British champions Wigan, helping Brisbane become the first NSWRL club to win the match in Britain. The following year he again played in the Broncos' grand final, helping them to a second consecutive premiership. He was a replacement player in Brisbane's 20–14 loss to Wigan in the 1994 World Club Challenge at Lang Park. Plath was also used from the bench in Brisbane's win over the Cronulla-Sutherland Sharks in the Broncos' Super League grand final for the 1997 Telstra Cup before keeping his big-game interchange reputation intact in a cameo role in the Broncos' 1998 NRL grand final win against the Canterbury Bulldogs.

After retiring from playing, Plath spent two years at Wynnum-Manly as a development officer and CEO.

In 2016 John Plath or "Plathy" as he is affectionately known has returned to Rugby Union assisting in coaching the Wynnum Bugs. He's also taken on a special mentoring project at the club with the teams struggling players, giving them a name "The Red Rockets" to try to lift them out of their squalor.

References

1969 births
People educated at Brisbane State High School
Australian rugby league players
Brisbane Broncos players
Wynnum Manly Seagulls players
Rugby league hookers
Rugby league halfbacks
Rugby league locks
Living people
Australian rugby league administrators
Rugby league players from Queensland